Pixley ka Seme is one of the five districts of the Northern Cape province of South Africa. The seat of Pixley ka Seme is De Aar. The majority (77%) of its 186,351 people speak Afrikaans as first language (2011 Census). The district code is DC7. It is named after Pixley ka Isaka Seme, one of the founders of the African National Congress.

Geography

Neighbours
Pixley ka Seme is surrounded by other districts as follows:

Local municipalities
The district contains the following local municipalities:

Demographics
The following statistics are from the 2011 census.

Gender

Ethnic group

Age

Politics

Election results
Election results for Pixley ka Seme in the South African general election, 2004.
 Population 18 and over: 99 868 [60.67% of total population]
 Total votes: 66 585 [40.45% of total population]
 Voting % estimate: 66.67% votes as a % of population 18 and over

See also
Karoo a general geographical area in South Africa

References

External links
 

District municipalities of the Northern Cape
Pixley ka Seme District Municipality
Karoo